The 1965–66 British Ice Hockey season featured the Coca-Cola Championship, consisting of separate leagues comprising English and Scottish teams.

The league was a failure with more than half of the games in Section B of the league not contested. No additional details exist on the competition. There was also a mention of a "Scottish League" featuring teams from Fife, Edinburgh, Paisley, Ayr, Durham, Brighton and Wembley.

Oxford University defeated Cambridge University 16-2 at the Richmond Ice Rink in the varsity match.

Murrayfield Racers defeated the Durham Hornets by a score of 11-8 in the Icy Smith Cup Final, which was a tournament that was the forerunner of the British Championship playoffs.

References

British
1965 in English sport
1966 in English sport
1965 in Scottish sport
1966 in Scottish sport